The Kodza Déré Decauville Railway (Greek: Κοτζά Ντερέ ντεκοβίλ) was a  long narrow-gauge military railway, which was built and operated by French troops during World War I from 1917 to 1918 at Paionia near Polykastro in Makedonia.

History 

The valley of the Kodza Déré River was of strategi­cal im­por­tance to the Allied Forces of World War I because the French headquarters were based near Axioupolis and a camp of the 122th Division and military hospital was located near Pigi. The front line was just a few kilometers above on the height of the Skra-di-Legen Canyon, where the Battle of Skra-di-Legen was fought. Similar to the nearby Battles of Doiran in 1917 and 1918 there were lengthy battles with heavy losses in the area.

Route 

The Decau­ville railway with a gauge of  started from the railway station Axioupolis (Αξιούπολης). The station was known until 1927 as Goumentja. The railway crossed the town of Axioupolis, historically known as Bohemitsa (Μποέμιτσα) passing two churches and a mosque. To gain height quickly, it went through an elaborately built Vróncho Spiral (βρόγχο), to Pigi (Πηγή), then known as Isvor. From there it followed the valley of the Kodza Déré River to the terminus Black Tree (μαύρο δένδρο) below the Koúpa Mountain (Κούπα), to supply the Allied Forces at the Macedonian front with supplies and ammunition.

The track and most of the bridges were lifted after the war, but the route with its deep cuts and high embankments is partially still recognisable in the countryside.

Gallery

References 

600 mm gauge railways in Greece
Kilkis (regional unit)
Railway lines in Greece
Military railways
Macedonian front
Decauville